Toltrazuril is a coccidiostat.

See also 
 Clazuril
 Diclazuril
 Ponazuril

References 

Antiparasitic agents
Trifluoromethyl compounds
Thioethers
Phenol ethers
Isocyanuric acids
Trifluoromethylthio compounds